The Pebbles were a Belgian rock band from Hoboken, Antwerp in Belgium, who came out of the beat boom and would enjoy some international success in the late 1960s.

Biography
The band was formed in Hoboken, Antwerp by Fred "Bekky" Beekmans and Bob "Bobott" Baelemans, initially calling themselves 'The Fredstones'. In 1965 they met producer Norman Petty, who was on a promo tour in Europe. They recorded a couple of singles with Petty, who also suggested them to change their name into 'The Pebbles.'  In 1967 they signed with manager Louis de Vries, who was also working with Ferre Grignard. De Vries managed to get them signed with record label Barclay. One year later they released their single "Get Around", which became their first hit. Their next single "Seven Horses in the Sky" became their biggest success.

The band scored a couple of hits in Belgium, France and Spain and started to build a good live-performance reputation, which resulted in them sharing the bill with Jimi Hendrix and The Small Faces at the Olympia in Paris. Because Barclay was not interested in the Anglo-Saxon world, they never released anything in the UK. The band decided to send a copy of their single "Incredible George"  to George Harrison, whom the song was about. Harrison was charmed by their music, which lead The Pebbles into almost signing with Apple Records, the label founded by The Beatles, and sent them a telegram congratulating them.  However, Barclay would not let them go so the record deal was off.

In 1969, they released their first album The Pebbles. Though the sales were not as good as hoped for. The discussions between members Luc Smets and Fred Bekky, about the musical direction the band was heading, reached its climax, dividing the band into two. As a result, the band went through some personnel changes.

Years later they finally managed to end their obligations with Barclay and signed with United Artists, wanting airplay in the UK and US. In 1973 they released their second album Close Up. They had some minor hits, but never managed to have the same success as before.  The band split in 1974, with certain members starting their own projects.  The Pebbles are still considered to be one of the first and most successful pop/rock bands in Belgium.

Members
 Guitar/Vocals: Fred "Bekky" Beekmans / Bob "Bobott" Baelemans
 Bass: Miel Gielen / Axel Van Duyn / Patrick Wyns
 Drums: Louis De Laet / Marcel De Cauwer / Rafael "Johnny" Verhas / Tony Gyselinck
 Keyboard: Luc Smets / Tim Turcksin / Ronny Brack

Discography

Albums
 The Pebbles / Jess & James – Pop made in Belgium (Music For Pleasure – 1966)
 The Pebbles (Barclay – 1969)
 Close Up (United Artists – 1973)
 The Story of the Pebbles 1964-1994 (Indisc – 1994)

Singles
 "Let's say goodbye" (CBS, 1965)
 "It's alright with me now" (CBS, 1965)
 "Huma la la la" (Canon, 1966)
 "Someone to lov" (Arcade, 1967)
 "I got to sing / You better believe it" (Barclay, 1967)
 "Get Around" (Barclay, 1967)
 "Seven Horses in the Sky" / "The verger" (Barclay, 1968)
 "Incredible George / Playing chess" (Barclay, 1969)
 "Mackintosh" (Barclay, 1969)
 "24 hours at the border" (Barclay, 1970)
 "To the rising sun" (Barclay, 1971)
 "Down at Kiki" (Barclay, 1971)
 "Beggar / Amontillado" / Fire (Barclay, 1971)
 "Mother army" (United Artists, 1972)
 "Jan, Suzy and Phil" (United Artist, 1972)
 "Some kind of joker" (United Artists, 1973)
 "No time at all" (United Artists, 1974)
 "The kid is allright" (United Artists, 1974)
 "Figaro" (Killroy, 1980)

References

External links
 

Belgian rock music groups
Musical groups established in 1965
Musical groups disestablished in 1974